The North Carolina Superintendent of Public Instruction is an elected constitutional officer in the executive branch of the government of the U.S. state of North Carolina. As the head of the North Carolina Department of Public Instruction, the superintendent oversees the public school systems of the state. They also serve as the secretary of the North Carolina State Board of Education and are a member of the North Carolina Council of State. The incumbent is Catherine Truitt, who became superintendent on January 2, 2017.

The position of state superintendent was originally created in 1852 to run the new Department of Public Instruction. The office was abolished in 1865 but reestablished by the 1868 state constitution as a member of the new State Board of Education. The duties of the superintendent have been altered over time by the North Carolina General Assembly. A new state constitution in 1971 designated the superintendent as the secretary of the Board of Education, but removed the office's voting power on the body. The relationship between the superintendent and the board since the 1960s has been characterized by conflict and confusion over their responsibilities.

History of the office 
In 1837 the North Carolina General Assembly passed a common school law to combine state and local funds to create a public school system. In 1852 the assembly created the Department of Public Instruction to be led by the Superintendent of Common Schools. Calvin H. Wiley served in the office from January 1, 1853, until April 25, 1865, when the state declared its offices vacant due to the surrender of the Confederate States of America in the American Civil War. Later that year the General Assembly declined to appropriate state funds for public schools and abolished the position of superintendent, effectively terminating the public school system. In 1868 the state ratified a new constitution that provided for a system of public schools to be led by a Superintendent of Public Instruction and a State Board of Education, of which the superintendent was an ex officio member. Under this framework, the superintendent was tasked with managing the school system and implementing relevant laws, creating an annual report on education in the state, and studying effective educational techniques in other jurisdictions.

The duties of the superintendent and the structure of the Department of Public Instruction have been altered over time by the General Assembly. In 1933 the legislature placed the superintendent on the new State School Commission, which was responsible for educational financing. The commission was disbanded in 1943. That year, the constitution was amended to revise the composition of the State Board of Education, leaving the superintendent a member but adding several seats to be filled by appointment from the governor, imbuing the body with a rivalling political authority over education policy. Conflict between the superintendent and the rest of the board over the scope of their responsibilities became common in the 1960s and 1970s. A 1968 constitutional study commission recommended making the Board of Education responsible for the selection of the superintendent to reduce voters' burden by shortening the ballot, but this proposal was disregarded by the General Assembly when it rewrote the state constitution in 1971. The new constitution made the superintendent the secretary of the State Board of Education, thus removing the office's membership and voting power on the board. In 1987 another effort was made to make the office appointed by the board in an attempt to simplify governance of the state's educational system. The North Carolina Senate passed a constitutional amendment to that effect with the support of the governor and lieutenant governor but the bill was quashed in a House of Representatives committee. The following year the legislature empowered the superintendent to organize the structure of the Department of Public Instruction, spend its funds, and enter into relevant contracts in the course of its operations. As secretary to the State Board of Education, the superintendent was made responsible for expenditures related to the board's duties and for implementing its policy decisions.

In the 1990s the Board of Education established the position of deputy superintendent and delegated direct management authority to them. School officials subsequently complained about a lack of clarity in the leadership of the Department of Public Instruction, and the Public School Forum of North Carolina dubbed the system a "four-head monster" under the competing authorities of the superintendent, deputy superintendent, the Board of Education, and the governor. In 1995 the General Assembly passed legislation transferring most of the superintendent's powers to the Board of Education. In 1997 the General Assembly again attempted to amend the constitution to remove the popular election of the superintendent, with the effort narrowly failing by two votes in the North Carolina House of Representatives. "Dual-reporting" positions within the Department of Public Instruction, which encompassed employees who were responsible both to the superintendent and the board, came into frequent use during Bob Etheridge's tenure as the superintendent.

June Atkinson, who was sworn in in 2005, was the first woman elected to the office. In 2009, Governor Bev Perdue attempted to circumvent Atkinson's authority by appointing a chief executive officer to run the Department of Public Instruction, effectively rendering the superintendent a symbolic official. The governor justified her decision by arguing that it was "adding accountability and clear direction to a system that is badly in need of both." Atkinson sued to assert her leadership over the department, and the Wake County Superior Court decided in her favor, ruling that she was in charge of the chief executive officer.

In 2016 the General Assembly passed legislation transferring some of the board's powers to the superintendent. The board sued to block the law, and in 2018 the Supreme Court of North Carolina ruled that the superintendent was responsible "over all matters relating to the direct supervision and administration of the public school system" while also affirming that the board had "ultimate authority under the Constitution to supervise and administer the state's public school system" and that the board can determine "the mechanics of the relationship between the Board and the Superintendent, as well as how their respective departments will operate internally." In wake of the decision, Superintendent Mark Johnson eliminated dual reporting positions, making all such employees responsible only to him. The incumbent, Catherine Truitt, was sworn in to the office on January 2, 2021.

Duties and structure 

The Superintendent of Public Instruction is the only constitutional officer in North Carolina assigned responsibilities solely concerning public education. The office holder is not subject to term limits. In the event of a vacancy in the office, the Governor of North Carolina has the authority to appoint a successor until a candidate is elected at the next general election for members of the General Assembly. Per Article III, Section 8 of the constitution, the superintendent sits on the Council of State. The State Board of Education is responsible for setting education policy, and the superintendent serves as the board's secretary and chief administrative officer. The superintendent is not themselves a formal member of the board. The superintendent is empowered by general statute to appoint a local school system superintendent to serve as one of eight advisory members on the board. As board secretary, the superintendent is responsible for managing the board's funds and its aid appropriations to local school boards. They are an ex officio member of several state boards and commissions. They are seventh in the line of succession to the governor.

The superintendent manages the Department of Public Instruction. The department is divided into three sections each under the leadership of an assistant superintendent: Instructional and Accountability Services, Information and Technology Services, and Financial and Personnel Services. As of December 2022, the department has 886 employees retained under the terms of the State Human Resources Act. As with all Council of State officers, the superintendent's salary is fixed by the General Assembly and cannot be reduced during their term of office. In 2022, the superintendent's annual salary was $146,421. They maintain an office in the Department of Public Instruction building.

List of Superintendents of Public Instruction

Notes

References

Works cited 
 
 
 
 
 

 
1853 establishments in North Carolina